Panaphelix is a genus of moths belonging to the subfamily Tortricinae of the family Tortricidae.

Species
Panaphelix asteliana Swezey, 1932
Panaphelix marmorata Walsingham, 1907

See also
List of Tortricidae genera

References

External links
tortricidae.com

Archipini
Endemic moths of Hawaii
Tortricidae genera